The CAVB qualification for the 2018 FIVB Volleyball Men's World Championship saw member nations compete for three places at the finals in Italy and Bulgaria.

CAVB Board of Administration meeting of 25 May 2017 decided to merge the 2017 Men's African Volleyball Championship and 2018 FIVB World Championship Continental Qualifiers. The top three teams from amongst the teams, who had registered with FIVB for the 2018 World Championship, qualified to represent Africa in the 2018 World Championship.

Pools composition
32 CAVB national teams entered the qualification. But, Burundi, Central African Republic, Gabon, Gambia, Lesotho, Malawi, Namibia, Senegal, Sudan, Tanzania, Zimbabwe, Seychelles, Mauritius and Madagascar later withdrew.

First round
There were seven confederation zonal competitions. The teams were distributed according to their geographical positions. The winners of each competition competed in second round.

 qualified to second round as host country in 2017 Men's African Volleyball Championship.

Tunisia, Cameroon and Algeria qualified to second round as top three FIVB ranking teams. Ranking as per 7 July 2017 are shown in brackets.

Berths for second round

Second round
The second round was 2017 African Championship which acted also as a qualifier for the 2018 World Championship. The top three teams from World ranking as of 7 July 2017 and the host directly qualified from first round. If the top three ranking teams have already qualified, the next best team from their pool would replace them in this round.

Pool standing procedure
 Number of matches won
 Match points
 Sets ratio
 Points ratio
 If the tie continues as per the point ratio between two teams, the priority will be given to the team which won the last match between them. When the tie in points ratio is between three or more teams, a new classification of these teams in the terms of points 1, 2 and 3 will be made taking into consideration only the matches in which they were opposed to each other.

Match won 3–0 or 3–1: 3 match points for the winner, 0 match points for the loser
Match won 3–2: 2 match points for the winner, 1 match point for the loser

First round

Pool A
Venue:  Tunis, Tunisia
Dates: 21–23 September 2017

|}

|}

Pool B
Cape Verde qualified for the 2017 African Championship. Gambia and Senegal withdrew from qualification.

Pool C
Venue:  Niamey, Niger
Dates: 8–10 July 2017

|}

|}

Pool D
Venue:  Stade des Martyrs, Kinshasa, DR Congo 
Dates: 20*–21 May 2017

|}

|}

* Match on 20 May 2017 (Congo lead DR Congo 2–1: –, 25–22, 26–24) was abandoned due to insufficient light, and replayed the following day.

Pool E
Venue:  Amahoro Indoor Stadium, Kigali, Rwanda 
Dates: 22–24 July 2017

|}

|}

Pool F
Venue:  Politecnica Hall, Maputo, Mozambique 
Dates: 30 June – 2 July 2017

|}

|}

 qualified for the 2017 African Championship as the winners of zone but later withdrew.

Pool G
Seychelles, Mauritius and Madagascar withdrew from qualification.

2017 African Championship

Venues:  Cairo Stadium Indoor Hall 2, Cairo, Egypt and  Cairo Stadium Indoor Hall 3, Cairo, Egypt
Dates: 22–29 October 2017
The top three teams qualified for the 2018 World Championship.

References

2018 FIVB Volleyball Men's World Championship
2017 in men's volleyball